Cornelis Nicolaas "Niek" van Dijk is an orthopaedic surgeon, a specialist in sports traumatology and arthroscopic surgery of the ankle and knee. Until 2016 Van Dijk was Full Professor in Orthopaedics and head of the Orthopaedic Department at the AMC-hospital in Amsterdam (Academic Medical Centre, University of Amsterdam). He continues his career in the FIFA Medical Centres of excellence in Madrid and Porto. He is the founder of a characteristic approach, which has come to be known as the Amsterdam Foot & Ankle School (aka The Amsterdam Approach):

Niek van Dijk has won renown as a leading authority for arthroscopic surgery of the ankle and the knee. In particular, he is known for his Amsterdam Ankle School (the Amsterdam Approach), which places particular emphasis upon a painstaking diagnosis, followed by arthroscopy as a surgical resource rather than a mere diagnostic. His operative techniques have spread throughout the world, and have benefitted leading athletes, as well as ordinary people suffering from ankle problems.

Education
Niek van Dijk was born in Amsterdam, on 20 May 1951. He received his MD in 1977 from the University of Leiden. He began his residency at Utrecht's Centraal Military Hospital, and continued at Wilhelmina Gasthuis Department of Experimental Surgery, in Amsterdam. Between 1979 and 1985 he was trained by Professor Dr. R.K. Marti in Orthopaedic Surgery at the Amsterdam Academic Medical Center (AMC), where he commenced his career as an orthopaedic surgeon. In March 1994, he obtained his Ph.D. from the University of Amsterdam. His thesis was entitled “Diagnostic strategies in patients with severe ankle sprain”, and his promoter was Professor Dr. R.K. Marti, the former head of Orthopaedic Surgery at AMC.

Appointments
 1985		 	Orthopaedic consultant, National Ballet, Amsterdam. 
 2000-2001   President Dutch Orthopaedic Association 
 2001  		Professor  Arthroscopic Surgery at the University of Amsterdam
 2002-2016			Head of the Orthopaedic Department at Academic Medical Center and Full Professor at the University of Amsterdam
 2003-2005   President Dutch Orthopaedic Association 
 2008-2010   President Nordic Orthopaedic Federation
 2008	        	President European Ankle and Foot Association 
 2010            Affiliate Professor, University of Minho, Portugal
 2010-2012   President European Society of Sports Traumatology, Knee Surgery and Arthroscopy 
 2014		  Affiliate Professor, University of Porto, Portugal
 2014            Congress president biannual ESSKA Congress Amsterdam

Honorary memberships and awards

 2005 Honorary member of the Greek Arthroscopy Association (HAA) Thessaloniki, Greece.
 2005 Cappagh Trust Lecture: ”Lateral Ankle Ligament Lesions”;Visiting Professor, Cappagh National Orthopaedic Hospital, Dublin, Ireland.
 2007 Honorary member Czech Society for Sports Traumatology and Arthroscopy (SSTA)
 2007 Rose Honorary Lecture: “Treatment of OCD”; Visiting Professor, Hospital of Special Surgery (HSS),New York, USA.
 2010 Grand Round Lecture “Osteochondral Talar Defects: Current Concepts”; Visiting Professor  Harvard University, Boston, USA.
 2011 Honorary member of the ASTAOR (The Association of Sports Traumatology, Arthroscopy, Orthopaedic surgery and Rehabilitation), Russia
 2011 Honorary member of GRECMIP (Groupe de la Chirurgie Mini-Invasive et de la Cheville) France.
 2013 Honorary member Slovak Society of Arthroscopy and Sport Traumatology (SSAST)
 2014 ESSKAR-award  for the most valuable section/ committee of ESSKA (as president of ESSKA-AFAS)
 2014 Honorary Lecture “Osteochondral defects in the ankle: the rationale for diagnosis and treatment”, 29th GOTS (Association of Orthopaedic and Traumatologic Sports Medicine) Annual Congress, Munich, Germany
 2014 Presidential lecture “Actual dilemmas and future in orthopaedics”, XIII International Congress of the Argentine Arthroscopy Association (AAA), Buenos Aires, Argentina
 2014 Honorary member of the Argentine Arthroscopy Association (AAA)
 2015 Honorary member of Sociedade Portuguesa de Artroscopia e Traumatologia Desportiva (SPAT)

Editorial roles

Member of several editorial boards:

 KSSTA journal
 Acta Orthopaedica et Traumatologica Turcica (AOTT)
 Journal of Experimental Orthopaedics (JEO)
 Journal of Orthopaedics Trauma and Rehabilitation (Hong Kong)
 AP-SMART (Asia Pacific Journal of Sports Medicine, Arthroscopy, Rehabilitation and Technology)

Corresponding member of:

 Deutschprachige Arbeitsgemeinschaft für Arthroskopie (AGA)
 Colombian and Chilean Society of Orthopaedic Surgery and Traumatology.
Editor-in-Chief of:
 Journal of ISAKOS (JISAKOS)

Founding member roles

 International Achilles Tendon Study Group, which has published four books on Achilles tendon problems. 
 Ankle and Foot Associates, a Section of the European Society of Sports Traumatology, Knee Surgery & Arthroscopy (ESSKA-AFAS)

Publications

Niek van Dijk has written or co-edited 11 books, published more than 280 indexed SCI-publications. 
He has written more than 100 book chapters and presents on average 25 international invited lectures a year.

Author:
 Ankle Arthroscopy. Techniques developed by the Amsterdam Foot and Ankle School, Author: C. Niek van Dijk, Springer Heidelberg New York London, 2014, with anatomical illustrations by Pau Golanó.  
 Inaugural address : “Beweegredenen. De patient als bron van inspiratie”, C. Niek van Dijk, Vossiuspers UvA, Amsterdam, The Netherlands, 2002.
 Thesis: “On Diagnostic Strategies in Patients with Severe Ankle Sprain”, author: C. Niek van Dijk, Rodopi, Amsterdam, 1994.

Co-editor:
 Current Concepts in Achilles tendon disorders. A comprehensive overview of diagnosis and treatment. Editors: Jon Karlsson, James Calder, C. Niek van Dijk, Nicola Maffulli, Hajo Thermann, DJO publications Guildford UK, 2014.
 Talar Osteochondral defects, Editors: C. Niek van Dijk, John G. Kennedy, Springer Heidelberg New York Dordrecht London, 2014.
 ESSKA Instructional Course Lecture Book, Amsterdam 2014, Editors: S. Zaffagnini, R. Becker, G.M.M.J. Kerkhoffs, J. Espregueira Mendes, C.N. van Dijk, Springer Heidelberg New York Dordrecht London, 2014.
 ESSKA Instructional Course Lecture Book, Geneva 2012, Editors: J. Menetrey, S. Zaffagnini, D. Fritschy, C.N. van Dijk, Springer Heidelberg New York Dordrecht London, 2012.
 Disorders of the Achilles Tendon Insertion. Current Concepts, Editors: James Calder, Jón Karlsson, Nicola Maffulli, Hajo Thermann, C. Niek van Dijk, DJO Publications Guildford UK, 2012.
 Current Concepts in Achilles Tendinopathy, Editors: James D. Calder, Jón Karlsson, Nicola Maffulli, Hajo Thermann, C. Niek van Dijk DJO Publications Guildford UK, 2010.
 Current Concepts in Achilles Tendon Rupture, Editors: C. Niek van Dijk, Jon Karlsson, Nicola Maffulli, Hayo Thermann, DJO Publications, Guildford, UK, 2008.
 Foot and Ankle Clinics “Arthroscopy of the Foot and Ankle”, Guest editor: C. Niek van Dijk, consulting editor Mark S. Myerson, Elsevier Saunders, Philadelphia, June 2006,volume 11, number 2.

Famous patients (selection)
 Keylor Navas, Goalkeeper at Real Madrid and Costa Rica national team.
 Cristiano Ronaldo, Soccer player Manchester United and Real Madrid, World Soccer player of the year 2008, 2013.
 Képler Laveran Lima Ferreira (Pepe), Soccer player Real Madrid. Portugal National team
 Juan Carlos Navarro, Basketball player FC Barcelona, All-Europa player of the year (2009, 2010, 2011)
 Robin van Persie, Football player Arsenal, Manchester United, Fenerbahçe and Netherlands National team
 Riccardo Montolivo, Football player AC Milan
 El Shaarawy, Football player AC Milan
 Marco van Basten, Ajax & AC Milan
 Marcus Fernaldi Gideon, Indonesian badminton player, former world number 1.

References

External links
 AMC Professional Webpage C. Niek van Dijk
 List of Publications on PubMed C. Niek van Dijk
 List of Publications on ResearchGate C. Niek van Dijk
 Amsterdam Foot & Ankle Platform
 European Society of Sports Traumatology, Knee Surgery & Arthroscopy
 Ankle and Foot Associates, a Section of ESSKA

1951 births
Living people
Dutch sports physicians
Dutch orthopedic surgeons
Physicians from Amsterdam
Traumatologists
University of Amsterdam alumni
Academic staff of the University of Amsterdam